The 1891 Boston Reds baseball team finished the season with a 93–42 record and won the American Association championship in their first season in the new league after the demise of the Players' League. Thus they became only the second team (after the 1889–1890 Brooklyn Bridegrooms) to win championships in two different leagues in successive seasons, as well as the only team to win the pennant every single season of its existence. After the season, the AA also disbanded, and the Reds team folded with the league.

Regular season

Season standings

Record vs. opponents

Opening Day lineup

Roster

Player stats

Batting

Starters by position 
Note: Pos = Position; G = Games played; AB = At bats; H = Hits; Avg. = Batting average; HR = Home runs; RBI = Runs batted in

Other batters 
Note: G = Games played; AB = At bats; H = Hits; Avg. = Batting average; HR = Home runs; RBI = Runs batted in

Pitching

Starting pitchers 
Note: G = Games pitched; IP = Innings pitched; W = Wins; L = Losses; ERA = Earned run average; SO = Strikeouts

Other pitchers 
Note: G = Games pitched; IP = Innings pitched; W = Wins; L = Losses; ERA = Earned run average; SO = Strikeouts

Relief pitchers 
Note: G = Games pitched; W = Wins; L = Losses; SV = Saves; ERA = Earned run average; SO = Strikeouts

References 
 1891 Boston Reds team page at Baseball Reference

Boston Reds (1890–91)
Boston Reds season